The Battle of Linyuguan (Yohwa) (臨渝關) was fought in 598 as part of the Goguryeo-Sui Wars.

In 597, tensions increased between Emperor Wen of Sui and King Yeongyang. Gang Yi-sik suggested that his king attack the Sui dynasty. King Yeongyang accepted and led 10,000 Mohe army himself along with more troops led by Gang Yi-sik. The Goguryeo army repeatedly attacked the pass at Linyuguan, but Wei Chong (韋冲), Governor of Yingzhou, defeated them.

In 598, Emperor Wen of Sui collected an army of 300,000 troops to defend the pass. He gave 200,000 troops to Yang Liang who is the fourth son of Emperor Wen and 100,000 marines to Zhou Luohou. All following attacks by Goguryeo on Linyuguan failed.

See also
 Military history of Goguryeo
 List of China-related topics
 History of China
 History of Korea

References

Linyuguan
Linyuguan
Linyuguan
Military history of Hebei
6th century in China
6th century in Korea
598